Alessandro Petrucci (died 7 June 1628) was a Roman Catholic prelate who served as Archbishop of Siena (1615–1628) and Bishop of Massa Marittima (1602–1615).

Biography
On 22 April 1602, Alessandro Petrucci was appointed during the papacy of Pope Clement VIII as Bishop of Massa Marittima.
On 5 May 1602, he was consecrated bishop by Camillo Borghese, Cardinal-Priest of San Crisogono, with Guglielmo Bastoni, Bishop of Pavia, and Horace Capponi, Bishop of Carpentras, serving as co-consecrators. 
On 23 March 1615, he was appointed during the papacy of Pope Paul V as Archbishop of Siena.
He served as Archbishop of Siena until his death on 7 June 1628.

References

External links and additional sources
 (for Chronology of Bishops) 
 (for Chronology of Bishops) 
 (for Chronology of Bishops) 
 (for Chronology of Bishops) 

17th-century Italian Roman Catholic archbishops
Bishops appointed by Pope Clement VIII
Bishops appointed by Pope Paul V
1628 deaths